Moviecom is one of the biggest cinema chain in Brazil. It has 82 theaters located in 16 cities in six different states.

Screens

References

External links
 Moviecom official website

Cinema chains in Brazil
Mass media companies of Brazil